"Left in the Dark" is a song by Jim Steinman from his only solo album Bad for Good.

The song gained more notice as performed by Barbra Streisand when released as the lead single from her album Emotion in autumn 1984. It was also recorded by Meat Loaf on the album Welcome to the Neighbourhood in 1995.

Barbra Streisand version
Streisand's rendition of the song is a power ballad which tells about experiences of a woman who finds out her partner has been cheating on her. "Left in the Dark" met with moderate commercial success internationally. The percussive synth sound in the intro is taken from Billy Squier's song "All Night Long", a track which was also produced by Steinman in 1984.

Music video
The music video for the song was Barbra's first video intended for MTV. Filmed within three days in Los Angeles in September 1984, it was directed by Jonathan Kaplan and included an appearance from Kris Kristofferson. The six-minute video portrays Barbra as a lounge singer entangled in a love triangle, with Kristofferson playing her partner.

Track listings
7" Single
A1. "Intro" – 0:44
A2. "Left in the Dark" – 6:12
B. "Here We Are at Last" – 3:18

7" Promotional Single
A. "Left in the Dark" (without spoken intro) – 4:58
B. "Left in the Dark" (with spoken intro) – 5:42

Chart performance

References

1981 songs
1984 singles
Barbra Streisand songs
Columbia Records singles
Pop ballads
Song recordings produced by Jim Steinman
Songs written by Jim Steinman
Song recordings with Wall of Sound arrangements